The following is an episode list for the ABC sitcom Who's the Boss?. The series stars Tony Danza and Judith Light, and centers on a widowed ex-Major League Baseball player from Brooklyn who relocates to an affluent Connecticut suburb with his daughter to become the housekeeper for a divorced advertising executive, her son and her mother. The series ran for eight seasons, debuting on September 20, 1984 and concluding with an hour-long series finale (part of a three-episode story arc) on April 25, 1992.

Series overview

Episodes

Season 1 (1984–85)

Season 2 (1985–86)

Season 3 (1986–87)

Season 4 (1987–88)

Season 5 (1988–89)

Season 6 (1989–90)

Season 7 (1990–91)

Season 8 (1991–92)
</onlyinclude>

References

 Episode guide at the website of The Who's the Boss? Resource. Retrieved on July 1, 2007
 Season 1, 2, 3, 4, 5, 6, 7, 8.
 Episode guide at TVIV.org website . Retrieved on July 4, 2007
 Season 1 2 3 4 5 6 7 8

External links
 

Lists of American sitcom episodes